Live at the Corner Hotel (2008) is a live album by Canadian singer/songwriter Jeff Martin. The album is a complete recording of a live performance with Irish drummer Wayne Sheehy. The show features the song A Line In The Sand from the debut self-titled album by Martin's new band The Armada.

Track listing 
 "The Bazaar" (The Tea Party)
 "Requiem" (The Tea Party)
 "I Love You" (Daniel Lanois cover)
 "The Messenger" (Daniel Lanois)
 "A Line In The Sand" (first single from new album)
 "Coming Home" (The Tea Party)
 "Release" (The Tea Party)
 "Lament"
 "The Kingdom"
 "Black Snake Blues"
 "Sister Awake" (The Tea Party)

Note: The CD label lists 12 tracks with "Winter Solstice" and "Lament" getting their own track numbers. However, once the album was put together they had gone over the time limit and needed to cut a track from the album. Jeff chose to cut Winter Solstice.

Credits 
 Jeff Martin - Vocals and Guitar
 Wayne Sheehy - Drums and Percussion

 Recorded and Mixed by Salt Location Recordings
 Produced by Jeff Martin, Peter Frawley, and Reggie Ray
 Mixed by Jeff Martin and Sam Lowe
 Engineered by Matt Muir and Gene Shev
 System Technicians: Sean McVitty and Yury Kogan
 Artwork by Marco Holtappel
 Photos by Karim De Groot

External links 
 
 photographer website

Jeff Martin (Canadian musician) albums
2008 live albums